David Clive Allan Walker (born 24 October 1945) is an English-born former professional association footballer who played as a full back in the 1960s and 1970s.

His clubs included Leicester City (for whom he played in the second leg of the 1965 Football League Cup Final), Northampton Town and Mansfield Town. On two occasions Walker managed Northampton Town and was manager (having been upgraded from assistant) of Maidstone United in their final season as a Football League club in 1992 before their financial liquidation.

He had three spells in charge of Dover Athletic (one as caretaker), a brief spell in charge of Ashford Town (Kent) and in March 2008 he was appointed as a short-term caretaker coach of Maidstone United.

References

1945 births
Living people
Footballers from Hertfordshire
Sportspeople from Watford
English footballers
English football managers
Association football defenders
English Football League players
Leicester City F.C. players
Northampton Town F.C. players
Mansfield Town F.C. players
Chelmsford City F.C. players
Ebbsfleet United F.C. players
English Football League managers
Northampton Town F.C. managers
Dover Athletic F.C. managers
Ashford United F.C. managers